Broomfield School may refer to:

 Broomfield School, London
 Broomfield School, New Zealand
 Broomfield School, North Yorkshire